Carmen Romo Sepúlveda was the mayor of Quilicura, Región Metropolitana, Chile, a large and bustling suburb of over 126,000 people in the Santiago de Chile metropolitan area since 1992. was the mayor of Quilicura for four consecutive periods.

Notes

Living people
People from Santiago
Women mayors of places in Chile
Mayors of places in Chile
Year of birth missing (living people)